KSHA (104.3 FM, commonly known as "K-Shasta") is a radio station in Redding, California, one of California's strongest Class C FM stations with its broadcast tower in Shasta Lake, California. K-Shasta airs a "Soft Hits/AC" format targeting the 25-54 demographic with local hosts on during most days, while playing the nationally syndicated Delilah Rene show at night. It is now owned by Stephens Media Group, which also owns its five sister stations in Redding.

Current personalities
Don Burton
Heather Ryan
Casey Freeland
"JD"

References

External links

SHA